Tregarland is a hamlet in the parish of Morval, Cornwall, England.

See also
Tregarlandbridge

References

Hamlets in Cornwall